The Rough Guide to the Music of Canada is a compilation album originally released in 2003. Part of the World Music Network Rough Guides series, it gives a wide overview of the music of Canada. Though contemporary styles are represented, the album focuses on roots revivalism, ranging from the traditional music of the Maritimes and Quebec to First Nations music and tracks representing Canada's wide ethnic range. The release was compiled by Dan Rosenberg & Philly Markowitz.

Gregory McIntosh of AllMusic gave the album three stars, calling it diverse but nicely flowing. BBC Music Magazine claimed the album was balanced toward "updated Irish", and lamented the lack of "unvarnished" native music.

Track listing

References

External links 
 

2003 compilation albums
World Music Network Rough Guide albums